Prior to its uniform adoption of proportional representation in 1999, the United Kingdom used first-past-the-post for the European elections in England, Scotland and Wales. The European Parliament constituencies used under that system were smaller than the later regional constituencies and only had one Member of the European Parliament each.

The constituency of Sussex East was one of them.

When it was created in England in 1979, it consisted of the Westminster Parliament constituencies of Brighton Kemptown, Brighton Pavilion, Eastbourne, East Grinstead, Hastings, Hove, Lewes, and Rye.  In 1984 it consisted of Bexhill and Battle, Brighton Kemptown, Brighton Pavilion, Eastbourne, Hastings and Rye, Hove, Lewes, and Wealden.

Sir Jack Stewart-Clark of the Conservatives was the MEP for the constituency's entire existence; he then went on to represent the new constituency of East Sussex and Kent South until 1999.

MEPs

Election results

References

External links
 David Boothroyd's United Kingdom Election Results

European Parliament constituencies in England (1979–1999)
Politics of East Sussex
1979 establishments in England
1994 disestablishments in England
Constituencies established in 1979
Constituencies disestablished in 1994